Mark Shea (24 April 1883 – 28 March 1939) was an Australian rules footballer who played for Fitzroy and Essendon in the Victorian Football League (VFL).

His brother, Patrick Augustus Shea (1886–1954), also played with Fitzroy and Essendon in the VFL.

Football
Shea, from East Melbourne's CBC Parade, could play a variety of positions but was most successful on the wing. He started out at Fitzroy and competed in finals his first two years, including a Preliminary Final in 1902.

Essendon secured his services in 1905 and was vice-captain for most of his time at the club. He played from the half back flank in Essendon's losing 1908 VFL Grand Final side, of which his brother Paddy Shea was also part of. Shea later served as a member of the Essendon committee.

References
 Holmesby, Russell and Main, Jim (2007). The Encyclopedia of AFL Footballers. 7th ed. Melbourne: Bas Publishing.
 Maplestone, M., Flying Higher: History of the Essendon Football Club 1872–1996, Essendon Football Club, (Melbourne), 1996.

External links

 
 
 Essendon Football Club profile

1883 births
1939 deaths
Australian rules footballers from Victoria (Australia)
Fitzroy Football Club players
Essendon Football Club players